James Henry "Harry" Bloy (born April 19, 1946 in Sudbury, Ontario) is a former BC Liberal Member of the Legislative Assembly, in the province of British Columbia, Canada. He started representing the riding of Burquitlam after the 2001 election then represented the riding of Burnaby-Lougheed from 2009 to 2013.

Bloy was the only member of the Liberal caucus to support Christy Clark in her successful 2011 leadership bid.  When Clark became premier in March 2011, Bloy was appointed to his first cabinet position as Minister of Social Development.  Bloy received criticism in this role and was demoted to a more junior position as Minister of State for Multiculturalism 6 months later. During this appointment, Liberal party members and public servants began work on what resulted in the 2013 Quick Wins ethnic outreach scandal.

Bloy announced his resignation from cabinet in March 2012 after admitting he leaked, to a private company, an email the government had received from a newspaper. It was subsequently revealed that Bloy would not run for re-election in the 2013 provincial election.

References

External links
Official Biography from the website of the Legislative Assembly of British Columbia
MLA Web Site of Harry Bloy

British Columbia Liberal Party MLAs
Living people
Politicians from Greater Sudbury
People from Coquitlam
1946 births
People from Burnaby
Members of the Executive Council of British Columbia
21st-century Canadian politicians